Mychel Jones (born August 19, 1988) is an American soccer player who currently plays for Florida Tropics SC in the Major Arena Soccer League, as well as for amateur side NTX Rayados.

Career

College and Amateur
Jones attended Southern Illinois University Edwardsville and appeared in 60 games for the Cougars, recording six goals and two assists from the backline. As a senior centerback in 2010, Jones helped lead SIUE to seven shutouts in 19 games and was chosen Second Team All-Missouri Valley Conference.

Professional
On January 18, 2011, Jones was drafted in the second round (#28 overall) in the 2011 MLS Supplemental Draft by Sporting Kansas City. He was waived by the team on May 5. He did not make any MLS appearances for Kansas City, but played in one reserve league match. On June 18, the New York Red Bulls announced that Jones had signed with the team. On June 28, 2011 Jones started his first match for New York playing the full 90 in a 2–1 victory over FC New York in the US Open Cup. During the 2011 Emirates Cup, Jones was included in the New York squad but did not play in either games against Paris Saint-Germain and Arsenal.

Jones was waived by New York on November 23, 2011.  He was signed by FC Hjørring of the Danish 1st Division on July 8, 2012.

On September 23, 2019, Jones was announced as one of the first five signees for Major Arena Soccer League expansion club Mesquite Outlaws.

Jones joined Florida Tropics SC on December 28, 2022, in a trade that saw VcMor Eligwe move to Dallas.

References

External links
 
 SIUE profile

1988 births
Living people
American soccer players
Association football defenders
Dallas Sidekicks (PASL/MASL) players
Vendsyssel FF players
Major Arena Soccer League players
Major League Soccer players
National Premier Soccer League players
New York Red Bulls players
People from St. Peters, Missouri
SIU Edwardsville Cougars men's soccer players
Soccer players from Missouri
Sporting Kansas City draft picks
Sporting Kansas City players
Sportspeople from Greater St. Louis
Expatriate men's footballers in Denmark
American expatriate soccer players
American expatriate sportspeople in Denmark
Florida Tropics SC players